Anna High School is a public high school located in Anna, Texas (USA). It is classified as a 4A school by the University Interscholastic League. It is part of the Anna Independent School District located in north central Collin County. In 2015, the school was rated "Met Standard" by the Texas Education Agency.

History
Effective for the 1989–1990 school year, nearby Westminster High School closed and students there began attending Anna High School. AHS also served students from neighboring Melissa ISD until the 2004–2005 school year, with the opening of Melissa High School. Anna High has been located at several campuses since the 1980s. The site that opened in 1987 now houses the ISD's DAEP program and school board. The site that opened in 2000 is now Anna Middle School. The current location opened for the 2011–2012 school year, and due to growth, will be expanded in the coming years.

Athletics
Anna High School competes in these sports:

Fall: Football, Volleyball, Cross Country, Team Tennis
Winter: Basketball, Soccer, Powerlifting
Spring: Baseball, Softball, Golf, Tennis, and Track & Field

State title 
 Boys Golf 
 1968(B)
 Young Filmmakers 
 2021(Division 1 Narrative)
Concert Band 
2021(4A)

State Finalists
Marching Band
2018(19th)(4A)
2021(5th)(4A)
TMEA Honor Band
2017(12th)(4A)
Concert Band
2021(4th)(4A)

State Runner-ups
Softball
2019(4A)
Anna Lady Coyotes Softball made history by going to the 4A State Championship but, fell short losing to Huffman Hargrave 12-0.
Girls Powerlifting
2019(4A) Region 6 Division 2 Team Results
Filmakers
Young Filmmakers 
2020(Division 1 Narrative)
Marching Band
2022(4A) State Silver Medalists

References

External links 
 

Public high schools in Texas
High schools in Collin County, Texas